The Undefeated is a 2019 poem by Kwame Alexander and illustrated by Kadir Nelson. The poem's purpose is to inspire and encourage black communities, while also delivering a tribute to black Americans of all occupations in past years. The poem describes the toughness black Americans faced during times such as slavery, and segregation in America. Nelson's illustrations also provide a visual for the meaning of the poem. The book was well received and won the 2020 Caldecott Medal and a Newbery Honor. Kadir Nelson's artwork also earned it a Coretta Scott King Award.

References 

2019 children's books
2019 poetry books
American picture books
Books about African-American history
Caldecott Medal–winning works
Coretta Scott King Award-winning works
Children's poetry books
Newbery Honor-winning works
2019 poems